The Brazil national football team participated in the 1986 FIFA World Cup, and in doing so maintained their record of being the only team to enter every World Cup Finals.

Brazil played until the quarter finals, where they were defeated by France on penalties.

Qualifying
1986 FIFA World Cup qualification (CONMEBOL Group 3)

June 2, 1985, Santa Cruz, Bolivia -  0 - 2 

June 16, 1985, Asunción, Paraguay -  0 - 2 

June 23, 1985, Rio de Janeiro, Brazil -  1 - 1 

June 30, 1985, São Paulo, Brazil -  1 - 1 

Brazil qualified.

The Cup

Group stage

Group D

Knockout stage

Last 16

Quarter Final

Roster

Head coach: Telê Santana

Starting 11

|}

Scorers

5 goals
 Careca

2 goals
 Josimar
 Sócrates

1 goal
 Edinho

External links
1986 FIFA World Cup on FIFA.com
Details at RSSSF
History of the World Cup-1986
Planet World Cup - Mexico 1986

 
Brazil